Tanah Rata is a state constituency in Pahang, Malaysia, that is represented in the Pahang State Legislative Assembly.

Demographics

History

Polling districts 
According to the gazette issued on 31 October 2022, the Tanah Rata constituency has a total of 17 polling districts.

Representation history

Election results

References 

Pahang state constituencies